Park Center is a census-designated place (CDP) in and governed by Fremont County, Colorado, United States. The CDP is a part of the Cañon City, CO Micropolitan Statistical Area. The Cañon City post office (Zip Code 81212) serves the area.

Geography

Demographics

See also

 List of census-designated places in Colorado

References

External links

 Park Center Water District
 Fremont County website

Census-designated places in Fremont County, Colorado
Census-designated places in Colorado